Elena Cristina Florica (born 11 May 1992) is a Romanian handballer for Râmnicu Vâlcea and the Romanian national team.

Achievements  
World University Championship:
Silver Medalist: 2016

References

External links

1992 births
Living people
People from Vâlcea County
Romanian female handball players
SCM Râmnicu Vâlcea (handball) players